Altos de Güera is a corregimiento in Tonosí District, Los Santos Province, Panama with a population of 632 . Its population as of 1990 was 814; its population as of 2000 was 751.

References

Corregimientos of Los Santos Province